Sabrina Pignedoli (born 24 October 1983 in Castelnovo ne' Monti) is an Italian politician and Member of the European Parliament since 2019.

Biography

First years
Sabrina Pignedoli grows in the province of Reggio Emilia, in Nismozza (today part of the municipality of Ventasso). She studied at the University of Bologna where she obtained a three-year degree in DAMS (Cinema address) and a specialist degree in Cinema, television and multimedia production.

Subsequently, she enrolled in the Master in Journalism of the University of Bologna and presented a thesis on the role of the press in the sidings of the massacre of 2 August 1980. In the meantime, she was practicing at the editorial offices of the regional news of Emilia-Romagna and the national newspaper Resto del Carlino. She has been a professional journalist since January 2010. She mainly collaborates with other national newspaper and ANSA.

Journalism
Since the beginning of the journalistic activity she deals with black and judicial news and comes into contact with the investigations on the expansion of the 'Ndrangheta outside Calabria. She decides to investigate his presence in the province of Reggio Emilia. The growing interest in families close to the 'ndrine leads, in 2013, to receive a telephone threat from a man close to the gangs (definitively sentenced with a final judgment on 2018-10-24) Pignedoli immediately reports the incident to the police. For the courage shown on the occasion, she is awarded by Anita Garibaldi with the certificate of Benemerita from the movement "A thousand women for Italy".

She enrolled at the University of Modena and Reggio Emilia and, in 2015, obtained a second specialist degree in International Law and Economics. In October of the same year her first book, "Operation Aemilia: Come una cosca di 'Ndrangheta si è insediata al nord", which earned her the Golden Eagle of the 2016 Estense Prize.

In May 2016, she moved to Rome, where he studied for the Ph.D. in Communication, social research and marketing, at the University of Rome La Sapienza. A collaboration begins with the journalist Ambra Montanari, with whom she investigates the expansion of the 'Ndrangheta in Germany.

Since March 2019, Pignedoli has been a part-time consultant to the Parliamentary Commission of Inquiry into the phenomenon of mafias and other criminal associations, including foreign ones, of the XVIII legislature.

Political activity
On 12 April 2019, Luigi Di Maio, political leader of the 5 Star Movement, proposed Pignedoli as leaders in the North-East constituency in the European elections. The online vote of the members of the Movement confirms their candidacy. On 26 May she was elected with 13768 votes.

Bibliography 
 Operazione Aemilia: Come una cosca di 'Ndrangheta si è insediata al Nord. S. Pignedoli. Imprimatur, 2015. 
 Le mafie sulle macerie del muro di Berlino. A. Montanari e S. Pignedoli. DIAKROS, 2019.

References

1983 births
Living people
MEPs for Italy 2019–2024
21st-century women MEPs for Italy
Five Star Movement MEPs